Sékana Diaby (born 10 August 1968) is a Ivorian former professional footballer who played as a defender.

He won the 1992 African Cup of Nations with the Ivory Coast.

External links
 
Profile at Turkish Football Federation
 Profile

Living people
1968 births
People from Daloa
Association football defenders
Ivorian footballers
Ivory Coast international footballers
1992 King Fahd Cup players
1988 African Cup of Nations players
1990 African Cup of Nations players
1992 African Cup of Nations players
Ivorian expatriate footballers
Expatriate footballers in France
Expatriate footballers in Turkey
Racing Club de France Football players
Stade Lavallois players
Stade Brestois 29 players
Louhans-Cuiseaux FC players
LB Châteauroux players
Pau FC players
Zeytinburnuspor footballers
Ligue 1 players
Ligue 2 players
Süper Lig players
Ivorian expatriate sportspeople in Turkey
Africa Cup of Nations-winning players